Sea Star Festival ( / Си Стар фестивал) is a music festival organized by the team behind EXIT Festival in Serbia. It was held for the first time on 26–27 May 2017 at the Stella Maris Resort in the City of Umag, while the second edition was held in 2018 on 25–26 May. The festival features rock, pop, electronic, techno, house, hip-hop, metal and punk acts performing on multiple stages. Some notable names who performed include Fatboy Slim, Paul Kalkbrenner, Dimitri Vegas & Like Mike, Hurts, Paul Van Dyk, Sven Väth, Wu-Tang Clan, Dubioza kolektiv, Amelie Lens, UMEK, Meduza, Onyx, The Prodigy, Robin Schulz and many more. 

In its first festival year in 2017, Sea Star was shortlisted in two categories at the annual European Festivals Awards which are held in Groningen, Netherlands, competing for the title of best mid-sized and best new festival. At national level, in 2017 Sea Star won the Capra D’Oro award given by Istria Tourist Board for promoting the region of Istra, while winning the "Ambasador" award in the same year for best new festival.

Sea Star also caught the attention of international media, with Travel Magazine concluding that with "outstanding productions the festival is set to be a stunner".

Location

Sea Star's Festival site is the Stella Maris Complex on the Istrian beach at the north of the Croatian seaside.

Key stages

Sea Star festival has six stages in total. The Tesla Main Stage presents the headliners of the festival, while Nautilus Arena, located under the main ATP stadium, is dedicated one night to hip-hop acts, and the other to alternative electronic music. Stages named Beach Groove Stage, Exotic Laguna and Silent Octopus bring a variety of genres with hip-hop, reggae, latino, bass, house, techno. Cinema Stage boasts a huge screen where movies and best EXIT performances are shown in HD.

History by years

Sea Star 2017 

Sea Star Festival 2017 took place 26–27 May 2017 and was attended by 50,000 people. Although it was planned to be a two-day festival, Day Zero was held on 25 May, as well as an after-party on 28 May 2017. 

The headlining acts for Sea Star 2017 included The Prodigy, Paul Kalkbrenner, Fatboy Slim, Dubioza kolektiv, Mahmut Orhan, Modestep LIVE, Pendulum DJ Set, Rambo Amadeus, SARS, Spiller, UMEK, Bad Copy, Urban&4, Elemental, Pips, Chips & Videoclips, Matter and many more. 

Sea Star festival presented a combination of various live and electronic acts, ranging from famous big beat and techno acts to acid house music, as well as rock and pop. Around 70 acts performed at the festival.

It was one of four festivals of EXIT Summer of Love 2017. EXIT Summer of Love celebrated the 50th anniversary of the Summer of Love and marked the most important events from 1967 when the revolutionary Peace Movement began. Besides Sea Star Festival, it included three more music festivals – Revolution Festival in Romania on 2–3 June 2017, EXIT Festival in Serbia on 6–9 July 2017 and Sea Dance Festival in Montenegro on 13–15 July 2017.

Sea Star 2018 

Sea Star Festival 2018 took place 25–26 May 2018. It was attended by 35,000 people.

The headlining acts for Sea Star 2018 included Dimitri Vegas & Like Mike, Hurts, Robin Schulz and Paul Van Dyk as well as Luke Slater, Ofenbach, Tram 11, Filatov & Karas, Edo Maajka & Bend and many more.

Sea Star festival presented a combination of various live and electronic acts, ranging from famous house and pop acts to trance music.

Disciples have cancelled their performance prior to the festival. Instead, they have performed at the 2018 edition of the EXIT Festival.

Sea Star is one of the six festivals of EXIT Freedom 2018. Besides Sea Star, EXIT Freedom includes six more music festivals – Festival 84 in Bosnia and Herzegovina on 15–18 March 2018, Revolution Festival in Romania on 31 May–2 June 2018, EXIT Festival in Serbia on 12–15 July 2018, Sea Dance Festival in Montenegro on 30 August–1 September and No Sleep Festival in Serbia on 15–18 November 2018.

Sea Star 2019 
Sea Star Festival 2019 took place 24–25 May 2019. It was attended by 40,000 people.

The headlining acts for Sea Star 2019 included Wu-Tang Clan, Sven Väth and many more.

Sea Star Festival 2019 presented a combination of various live and electronic acts, ranging from famous hip hop acts to techno and house music.

Sea Star was the first of the five festivals of EXIT Tribe 2019. Besides Sea Star, EXIT Tribe included four more music festivals – EXIT Festival in Serbia on 4-7 July 2019, Revolution Festival in Romania on 8-10 August 2019, Sea Dance Festival in Montenegro from 31 August to 1 September 2019 and No Sleep Festival in Serbia from 8-9 November 2019.

Sea Star 2020 
Sea Star Festival 2020 was supposed to take place 22–23 May 2020 until its cancellation and postponement to 2021, due to the COVID-19 Pandemic.

Organizers of the festival announced that all of the acts announced for Sea Star 2020 would be performing at the 2021 edition of the festival.

Sea Star 2021 
Sea Star Festival 2021 was supposed to take place 28–29 May 2021 until its cancellation and postponement to 2022, due to the COVID-19 Pandemic.

Organizers of the festival announced that all of the acts announced for Sea Star 2021 would be performing at the 2022 edition of the festival.

Sea Star 2022 
Sea Star Festival 2022 took place 27–28 May 2022. It was attended by 19,000 people on the first day.

The headlining acts for Sea Star 2022 included Onyx, Meduza, Amelie Lens, Dubioza Kolektiv, UMEK and many more.

Sea Star 2022 presented a combination of various live and electronic acts, ranging from famous hip-hop, techno and rock acts to electronica and house music.

It was the second of the eight festivals organized by the EXIT group. Besides Sea Star, EXIT included four more music festivals - No Sleep Festival in Serbia on 8–9 April and 11–12 November, EXIT Festival in Serbia on 7–10 July, respectively and Sea Dance Festival in Montenegro on 26–28 August and Ada Divine Awakening Festival in Montenegro on 13–18 September.

Sea Star 2023 
Sea Star Festival 2023 will take place 19–20 May 2023.

The headlining acts for Sea Star 2023 will include The Prodigy, Robin Schulz, Cypress Hill and many more.

Sea Star 2023 will present a combination of various live and electronic acts, ranging from famous hip-hop and electronic acts to psychedelic trance and dance music.

It will be the second of the eight festivals organized by the EXIT group. Besides Sea Star, EXIT includes four more music festivals - No Sleep Festival in Serbia in November, EXIT Festival in Serbia in July and Sea Dance Festival in Montenegro in August and Ada Divine Awakening Festival in Montenegro in September.

Festival by year

See also
List of electronic music festivals
Live electronic music

References

External links

Music festivals established in 2017
Electronic music festivals in Croatia
Tourist attractions in Istria County
Spring (season) events in Croatia